Statistics of UAE Football League in season 1980/81.

Overview
Al Ain FC won the championship.

References
United Arab Emirates - List of final tables (RSSSF)

UAE Pro League seasons
United
1980–81 in Emirati football